Hatimtai may refer to:

Hatim al-Tai, a pre-Islamic (Jahiliyyah) Arabian poet
Hatimtai (1929 film), a 1929 Indian film
Hatimtai (1933 film), a 1933 Indian film
Hatimtai (1947 film), a 1947 Indian film
Hatim Tai (1956 film), a 1956 Indian film
Haatim Tai (1990 film), a 1990 Indian film
Hatimtai Ki Beti, a 1955 Indian film	
Son of Hatimtai, a 1965 Indian film